Georges Brossard,  (February 11, 1940 – June 26, 2019) was a Canadian entomologist and founder of the Montreal Insectarium.
He died on June 26, 2019 at the age of 79.

Biography
An insect enthusiast from a very early age, Brossard held a career as a notary until the age of 38. He then started to travel, and on his travels studied the insects he came across with deep interest. In 1989, after having collected over 250,000 specimens, he solicited the then mayor of Montreal, Jean Doré, to open an insectarium. He and Pierre Bourque, then director of the Montreal Botanical Gardens, began a partnership to govern and operate the Montreal Insectarium. Brossard has founded four other insectariums across the globe, some of which are located as far as Shanghai and South Africa. Since the opening of the Montreal Insectarium, his collection, which he continued to amass through his travels, has grown to over 500,000 specimens.

Brossard wrote and directed 20 episodes of Mémoires d'insectes ("Insect Diaries"), and was the creator and host of the televised series Insectia. He was the cofounder and copresident of Montreal's Cinéma IMAX les Ailes.

In 2004, he was the subject of the fiction film Le Papillon Bleu (The Blue Butterfly) directed by Léa Pool, based on an event in Brossard's life which occurred in 1987. Working for the Children's Wish Foundation of Canada, Brossard traveled to South America with a boy in the terminal phase of cancer. It was the boy's dream to catch a mythical blue morpho butterfly, which Georges went to great lengths to find in the vast jungles, even putting his and the boy's lives in danger. They finally catch the butterfly, and upon returning to Québec, the cancer which had been slowly killing the child miraculously receded.

Georges Brossard died on June 26, 2019, at the Victor-Gadbois de Saint-Mathieu-de-Beloeil palliative care centre. He was 79 years of age. He had been admitted to the facility on June 18, suffering from lung cancer.

Awards
 1999 – Member of the Order of Canada
 Recipient of the Queen Elizabeth II Golden Jubilee Medal
 Léon-Provencher Prize from the Société d’Entomologie du Québec
 Louis-Riel Medal
 Doctorats Honoris Causa in sciences at Université du Québec à Trois-Rivières
 Doctorats Honoris Causa in sciences at McGill University.
 2006 – Knight of the National order of Quebec

See also
 List of entomologists
 Lists of Canadians#Scientists

References

External links
 Le Papillon Bleu website
 Georges Brossard on the Insectatium Website, complete with images
 Georges Brossard on Orizon

1940 births
2019 deaths
Canadian entomologists
French Quebecers
Knights of the National Order of Quebec
Members of the Order of Canada
People from La Prairie, Quebec
Deaths from lung cancer in Quebec